Julnar is a crater in the northern hemisphere of Saturn's moon Enceladus.  Julnar was first discovered in Voyager 2 and has only been seen at comparable resolution by Cassini.  It is located at 52.8° North Latitude, 350.0° West Longitude and is approximately 19 kilometers across.

Julnar is named after a character from Arabian Nights.  Also known as The Seaborn, Julnar is the heroine of nights 738–756.

References

External links
Hamah Sulci (Se-5) at  PIA12783: The Enceladus Atlas

Impact craters on Enceladus